Kiuic is a Maya archaeological site in the Puuc region of Yucatán, Mexico.

History
Kiuic was a Maya city of the Late and Terminal s, with evidence of earlier occupation.  It was abandoned by the Maya around 880 CE. The site is well-preserved, and in that regard compared by archaeologists to Pompeii.

Archaeology
First documented in print by John Lloyd Stephens and Frederick Catherwood in 1843, the site was visited by later Mayanists including Teoberto Maler.

The site has been under-going archaeological exploration since 2000, in part by Millsaps College archaeologists. Kiuic was extensively discussed in a PBS Nova and National Geographic special.

References

External links

 2005 Archeological report (PDF)

Maya sites in Yucatán
9th-century disestablishments in the Maya civilization